Procordulia jacksoniensis is a species of dragonfly in the family Corduliidae, 
known as the eastern swamp emerald. It inhabits rivers, pools and lakes in eastern Australia, from Brisbane through New South Wales, Victoria and Tasmania, and around Adelaide in South Australia.

Procordulia jacksoniensis is a small to medium-sized black and orange-yellow dragonfly with a thick, flattened tail.

Gallery

See also
 List of dragonflies of Australia

References

Corduliidae
Odonata of Australia
Endemic fauna of Australia
Taxa named by Jules Pierre Rambur
Insects described in 1842